Land of the Minotaurs is a fantasy novel by Richard A. Knaak, set in the world of Dragonlance, and based on the Dungeons & Dragons role-playing game. It is the fourth novel in the "Lost Histories" series. It was published in paperback in January 1996. It continues the story of Kaz the Minotaur from The Legend of Huma, Kaz the Minotaur, and the short story Kaz and the Dragon's Children from The Dragons of Krynn.

Plot summary
The minotaur empire is in decline, and a group of minotaurs in a small encampment are the final bastions of their way of life, which the ruling minotaurs who dominate the capital city have corrupted the original spirit of.

Reception
Tim Smith reviewed Land of the Minotaurs for Arcane magazine, rating it a 2 out of 10 overall. According to Smith, "Apparently this is a New York Times bestseller; apparently the author has a good track record; apparently minotaurs can happily survive outside of Greek legend. And apparently we still have to put up with pot boilers like this that aim to flesh out the ethos of the Dragonlance world." Smith suggested: "This should have a small logo with a piece of ancient hemp-rope and a dollar sign somewhere. You're better off sticking with your own imagination, which will far outshine anything you can find here. TSR must do much more to support their games than knock out this old, forumulaic, badly crafted pap."

References

1996 novels
Dragonlance novels